Milan Martinović (born 6 August 1979) is a Serbian former professional footballer who played as a defender.

Club career
After a breakthrough season with Rad in 1999–2000, Martinović moved abroad to Spain and joined La Liga side Oviedo in July 2000. He was subsequently loaned out to Red Star Belgrade during the 2001–02 season. Following a short spell at his parent club Rad in 2003, Martinović moved abroad for the second time and signed with French side Ajaccio, but made just one league appearance that season. He later returned again to Rad, before transferring to Maccabi Tel Aviv in the summer of 2006. In January 2008, Martinović switched to fellow Israeli Premier League club Bnei Yehuda. He also played briefly for Diyarbakırspor (Turkey) and Shenyang Dongjin (China).

International career
Internationally, Martinović represented FR Yugoslavia at under-18 and under-21 level.

Honours
Red Star Belgrade
 FR Yugoslavia Cup: 2001–02

References

External links

 
 
 
 
 

1979 births
Living people
Footballers from Belgrade
Serbia and Montenegro footballers
Serbian footballers
Association football defenders
Serbia and Montenegro under-21 international footballers
FK Rad players
Real Oviedo players
Red Star Belgrade footballers
AC Ajaccio players
Maccabi Tel Aviv F.C. players
Bnei Yehuda Tel Aviv F.C. players
Diyarbakırspor footballers
Shenyang Dongjin F.C. players
First League of Serbia and Montenegro players
La Liga players
Ligue 1 players
Israeli Premier League players
Süper Lig players
Serbia and Montenegro expatriate footballers
Serbian expatriate footballers
Expatriate footballers in Spain
Expatriate footballers in France
Expatriate footballers in Israel
Expatriate footballers in Turkey
Expatriate footballers in China
Serbia and Montenegro expatriate sportspeople in Spain
Serbia and Montenegro expatriate sportspeople in France
Serbian expatriate sportspeople in Israel
Serbian expatriate sportspeople in Turkey
Serbian expatriate sportspeople in China
Serbian football managers